Afonso Abel de Campos (born 4 May 1962) is an Angolan retired footballer who played as a right winger.

Club career
Born in Luanda, Campos started his career with local Atlético Petróleos de Luanda, where he won five Girabola championships in only six years. Subsequently, he caught the eye of Portuguese Primeira Liga side S.L. Benfica, who signed him for the 1988–89 season.

31 of Campos' league appearances with them came in that first year – 19 starts – and he added three goals to help his team to the domestic title. He continued competing in the country in the following three years, with C.F. Estrela da Amadora S.C. Braga and Sport Benfica e Castelo Branco, the latter club in the Segunda Liga.

Until his retirement, in 1998 at the age of 36, Campos alternated between Portugal and Indonesia. In the latter nation, he shared teams at Gelora Dewata with former Benfica teammate Vata.

International career
Campos represented Angola during eight years, making his debut in 1988. He appeared in six 1990 FIFA World Cup qualifying matches, and was part of the squad at the 1996 African Cup of Nations.

Personal life
Campos' son, Djalma, was also a footballer. He too spent most of his career in Portugal.

Honours

Club
Petro Atlético
Girabola: 1982, 1984, 1986, 1987, 1988
Taça de Angola: 1987

Benfica
Primeira Liga: 1988–89
Supertaça Cândido de Oliveira: 1988
European Cup: Runner-up 1989–90

References

External links

1962 births
Living people
Footballers from Luanda
Angolan footballers
Association football wingers
Girabola players
Atlético Petróleos de Luanda players
Primeira Liga players
Liga Portugal 2 players
S.L. Benfica footballers
C.F. Estrela da Amadora players
S.C. Braga players
Sport Benfica e Castelo Branco players
F.C. Alverca players
Liga 1 (Indonesia) players
Deltras F.C. players
1996 African Cup of Nations players
Angola international footballers
Angolan expatriate footballers
Expatriate footballers in Portugal
Expatriate footballers in Indonesia
Angolan expatriate sportspeople in Portugal